This list denotes all passenger rail (national services and commuter systems), heavy urban rail (such as rapid transit), light rail, and streetcars that are commuter-oriented. It does not include heritage streetcars, which are usually intended primarily to attract tourists and shoppers to downtown destinations, rather than serving as integral pieces of the regional transportation system.

Canada

National:
Via Rail – intercity rail network

Calgary
C-Train – 2 light rail lines, operated by Calgary Transit

Edmonton
Edmonton LRT – 2 light rail lines, operated by Edmonton Transit Service

Kitchener-Waterloo (Waterloo Region)

Ion rapid transit – 1 light rail line, operated by Grand River Transit

Montreal
Montreal Metro – 4 metro lines, operated by Société de transport de Montréal
Exo – 6 commuter rail lines, operated by the Réseau de transport métropolitain

Ottawa
O-Train – 2 light rail lines, operated by OC Transpo

Greater Toronto Area
Toronto Subway and RT – 4 metro lines; TTC Streetcars- 11 streetcar lines, operated by the Toronto Transit Commission
GO Train – 7 commuter rail lines, operated by GO Transit

Vancouver and Lower Mainland
SkyTrain – 3 metro lines; 
West Coast Express – 1 commuter rail line, operated by TransLink

Cuba

National
Ferrocarriles de Cuba – intercity rail network

Dominican Republic
Santo Domingo
Santo Domingo Metro – 2 metro lines, operated by Oficina para la Reorganizacion del Transporte

Mexico

Chihuahua and Sinaloa
Ferrocarril Chihuahua al Pacífico – an intercity line from the city of Chihuahua to the port of Topolobampo

Guadalajara
Guadalajara light rail system – 1 metro Line, 1 light rail line, operated by Sistema de Tren Eléctrico Urbano

Jalisco
Tequila Express – a tourist-oriented excursion line that runs from Guadalajara to Amatitán to visit a tequila distillery

Mexico City
Mexico City Metro – 11 metro lines, with 1 under construction, operated by Sistema de Transporte Colectivo
Xochimilco Light Rail – 1 light rail line, operated by Servicio de Transportes Eléctricos
Tren Suburbano – 1 commuter rail line, operated by Ferrocarril Suburbano de la Zona Metropolitana del Valle de México

Monterrey
Monterrey Metro – 1 elevated metro line, 1 underground light rail line, operated by S.T.C. Metrorrey

Puerto Rico
San Juan
Tren Urbano – 1 metro line, operated by Puerto Rico Department of Transportation and Public Works

United States

National
Amtrak – intercity rail network

Gulf and Southern states
Atlanta
MARTA Subway – 4 metro lines, operated by Metropolitan Atlanta Rapid Transit Authority (MARTA)
Atlanta Streetcar – 1 streetcar line, operated by the MARTA and the City of Atlanta

Austin
Capital MetroRail – 1 commuter rail line, operated by Capital Metropolitan Transportation Authority

Charlotte
LYNX Rapid Transit Services – 1 light rail line, 1 streetcar line, operated by Charlotte Area Transit System

Dallas–Fort Worth
A-train – 1 commuter rail line, operated by Denton County Transportation Authority
DART – 4 light rail lines, 1 streetcar  line (Dallas Streetcar), both operated by Dallas Area Rapid Transit (DART)
Trinity Railway Express – 1 commuter rail line, operated by DART and Trinity Metro
TEXRail – 1 commuter rail line, operated by Trinity Metro

Houston
METRORail – 3 light rail lines, with planned expansion, operated by Metropolitan Transit Authority of Harris County, Texas

Jacksonville
 JTA Skyway – 1 people mover line, operated by Jacksonville Transportation Authority

Miami-Fort Lauderdale-Palm Beach

Metrorail – 2 metro lines; Metromover – 3 people mover lines; both operated by Miami-Dade Transit

Brightline – 1 higher-speed rail line
Tri-Rail – 1 commuter rail line, 1 commuter rail line under construction, operated by the South Florida Regional Transportation Authority

Nashville
 Music City Star – 1 commuter rail line, operated by the Regional Transportation Authority

New Orleans
RTA Streetcars – 3 streetcar lines, operated by New Orleans Regional Transit Authority

Norfolk-Virginia Beach-Newport News (Hampton Roads)
Tide Light Rail – 1 light rail line, with planned extensions, operated by Hampton Roads Transit

Orlando
SunRail – 1 commuter rail line, operated by the Florida Department of Transportation

Midwest and Great Lakes states

Chicago
Chicago 'L' – 8 metro lines, operated by the Chicago Transit Authority
Metra – 11 commuter rail lines, operated by the Northeast Illinois Regional Commuter Railroad Corporation
South Shore Line – 1 commuter rail line, operated by Northern Indiana Commuter Transportation District

Cincinnati
Cincinnati Streetcar – 1 streetcar line, operated by the Southwest Ohio Regional Transit Authority

Cleveland
RTA Rapid Transit – 1 metro line, 2 light rail lines, operated by Greater Cleveland Regional Transit Authority

Detroit
Detroit People Mover – 1 people mover line, operated by Detroit Department of Transportation
QLine – 1 streetcar line, operated by M-1 Rail

Kansas City
KC Streetcar – 1 streetcar line, operated by the Kansas City Streetcar Authority

Milwaukee
The Hop – 1 streetcar line, operated by the City of Milwaukee

Minneapolis-St. Paul
METRO – 2 light rail lines, operated by Metro Transit
Northstar Commuter Rail – 1 commuter rail line, operated by the Metropolitan Council

 Oklahoma City

Oklahoma City Streetcar - 2 streetcar lines, owned by the Oklahoma City Transit Authority

 St. Louis

St. Louis MetroLink – 2 light rail lines, operated by Bi-State Development Agency

Northeast
Baltimore
Baltimore Metro Subway – 1 metro line 
MTA Light Rail, 3 light rail lines
MARC Train, 2 commuter rail lines (shared with Washington, DC metropolitan area), operated by Maryland Transit Administration

Boston
The T – 4 metro lines, 5 light rail lines;
MBTA Commuter Rail- 12 commuter rail lines, operated by Massachusetts Bay Transportation Authority
CapeFLYER - 1 commuter rail line, weekends only (operated jointly between MBTA and Cape Cod Regional Transit Authority

Buffalo
Buffalo Metro Rail – 1 light rail line, operated by Niagara Frontier Transportation Authority

Greater New York City (including Newark and Bridgeport/New Haven)
New York City Subway – 25 metro routes on 35 lines 
Staten Island Railway – 1 route
Long Island Rail Road – 11 commuter rail lines
Metro-North Railroad – 5 commuter rail lines, operated by Metropolitan Transportation Authority
PATH – 5 metro routes, operated by the Port Authority of New York and New Jersey
NJ Transit Rail – 10 commuter rail lines (shared with Philadelphia metropolitan area)
Hudson-Bergen Light Rail – 2 light rail line
Newark Light Rail – 2 light rail lines operated by New Jersey Transit
Hartford Line – 1 commuter rail line, operated by the Connecticut Department of Transportation
Shore Line East – 1 commuter rail line, operated by the Connecticut Department of Transportation

Greater Philadelphia
Philadelphia Subway – 2 metro lines
SEPTA Suburban Lines – 3 light rail lines
SEPTA Subway–Surface Trolley Lines – 6 streetcar lines
SEPTA Regional Rail – 13 commuter rail lines, operated by Southeastern Pennsylvania Transportation Authority
PATCO Speedline – 1 metro line, operated by the Port Authority Transit Corporation
NJ Transit Rail – 1 commuter rail line (shared with New York City metropolitan area), operated by New Jersey Transit
River Line – 1 light rail line, operated by New Jersey Transit

Pittsburgh
The T – 2 light rail lines (and one with operations presently suspended), operated by the Port Authority of Allegheny County

Greater Washington, D.C.
Washington Metro – 6 metro lines, operated by Washington Metropolitan Area Transit Authority
MARC Train – 3 commuter rail lines (shared with Baltimore metropolitan area), operated by the Maryland Transit Administration
Virginia Railway Express – 2 commuter rail lines, operated by the Potomac and Rappahannock Transportation Commission
DC Streetcar – 1 streetcar line, owned by the District of Columbia Department of Transportation and operated by a private contractor

West
Albuquerque-Santa Fe
New Mexico Rail Runner Express – 1 commuter rail line, operated by the New Mexico Department of Transportation

Denver
RTD Rail – 4 heavy rail lines and 6 light rail lines with two under construction, operated by the Regional Transportation District

Las Vegas
Las Vegas Monorail – 1 monorail line operated by the Las Vegas Monorail Company

Los Angeles-Inland Empire
Los Angeles County Metro Rail – 2 metro lines, 4 light rail lines, operated by Los Angeles County Metropolitan Transportation Authority
Metrolink – 7 commuter rail lines, operated by Southern California Regional Rail Authority

Phoenix
Valley Metro Rail – 1 light rail line, operated by Valley Metro

Portland
MAX Light Rail – 5 light rail lines, operated by TriMet
Portland Streetcar – 2 streetcar lines, owned by City of Portland, managed by a non-profit corporation, operated by TriMet
WES Commuter Rail – 1 commuter rail line, operated by TriMet

Sacramento
Sacramento RT Light Rail – 3 light rail lines, operated by Sacramento Regional Transit District

Salt Lake City
The FrontRunner – 1 commuter rail train, operated by Utah Transit Authority (UTA)
S Line streetcar – 1 streetcar line, with more planned, operated by UTA
TRAX – 3 light rail lines, with more lines planned, operated by UTA

San Diego
San Diego Trolley – 3 light rail lines operated by San Diego Metropolitan Transit System
The Coaster – 1 commuter rail line; Sprinter – 1 commuter rail line, operated by North County Transit District

San Francisco-Oakland-San Jose (Bay Area)
BART – 5 rapid transit lines, and one DMU light rail line, operated by San Francisco Bay Area Rapid Transit District
Muni Metro – 6 light rail lines, with one under construction; F Line – 1 streetcar line, operated by San Francisco Municipal Railway
VTA Light Rail – 3 light rail lines, operated by Santa Clara Valley Transportation Authority
Caltrain –1 commuter rail line, operated by the Peninsula Corridor Joint Powers Board
Altamont Corridor Express – 1 commuter rail line, operated by the San Joaquin Regional Rail Commission Joint Powers Board
SMART Train – 1 commuter rail line, to be operated by the Sonoma-Marin Area Rail Transit District

Seattle-Tacoma
Link light rail – 2 light rail lines (one in Tacoma), with a second under construction, operated by Sound Transit
Sounder Commuter Rail – 1 commuter rail line, operated by Sound Transit
Seattle Streetcar – 2 streetcar lines, owned by City of Seattle and operated under contract by King County Metro

Tucson, Arizona
Sun Link – 1 streetcar line, owned by the City of Tucson and operated by a private contractor

Systems under construction
Dallas-Fort Worth
Silver Line – commuter rail line, to be operated by Dallas Area Rapid Transit

Honolulu
Honolulu Rail Transit – 1 metro rail line, to be operated by TheBus

 Mexico City
Toluca–Mexico City commuter rail – 1 commuter rail line, to be operated by the Secretariat of Communications and Transportation

 Montreal
Réseau express métropolitain - repurposing and expanding the Deux-Montagnes line

 Orange County, CA
OC Streetcar – 1 streetcar line, to be operated by Orange County Transportation Authority

 Tempe, AZ
Tempe Streetcar – 1 streetcar line, to be operated by Valley Metro

Toronto
Transit City/The Big Move projects – 1 light rail line (Eglinton Crosstown line), with more in planning, to be operated by the Toronto Transit Commission

 Washington DC Metropolitan Area
Purple Line (Maryland) – 1 light rail line, to be operated by Purple Line Transit Partners, and owned by the Maryland Transit Administration

Approved systems preparing for construction
Charlotte
LYNX Purple Line – 1 commuter rail line, to be operated by LYNX Rapid Transit Services

San Juan
San Juan-Caguas Rail – 1 commuter rail line, to be operated by Puerto Rico Department of Transportation and Public Works

See also
 List of rail transit systems in the United States (currently operating systems only)
 List of railroad bankruptcies in North America

References

Transit
North America
Rail